Pierre Rabadan (born 3 July 1980, in Aix-en-Provence, Bouches-du-Rhone), is French international rugby union player, who plays his club rugby for Stade Français.

A specialist Number 8, Rabadan originally played for Pays d'Aix RC, but since 1998 for Stade Français. He made his international debut on 3 July 2004 against the United States. Rabadan has been a Deputy Mayor of Paris since 2020.

Honours
 Stade Français
French Rugby Union Championship/Top 14: 1999–2000, 2002–03, 2003–04, 2006–07

References

External links
Bio at ESPNScrum.com

1980 births
Living people
Sportspeople from Aix-en-Provence
French rugby union players
France international rugby union players
Rugby union number eights